The 29-Article Ordinance for the More Effective Governing of Tibet was supposed to be an imperial decree published in 1793 by the Qianlong Emperor in the Qing dynasty, the last imperial dynasty of China. Article 1 states that the purpose of Golden Urn is to ensure prosperity of Gelug, and to eliminate cheating and corruption in the selection process. Article 12 states that relatives of the Dalai Lama or Panchen Lama must not hold government positions, or participate in political affairs.

There were three versions in the Tibetan language, and the original was not found. The corresponding text in Chinese was not listed as 29 articles, but parts and parcels of it were seen in various Memorial to the throne and decrees.

In 1792, the Qianglong emperor published an article known as A Discourse on Lamas that described the history of lamas and the reincarnation system. In it he described how the Golden Urn system was invented and said it would be a more fair mechanism of selecting the Dalai Lama than choosing reincarnated lamas based on private designation, or based on one person's decision. Also, it's to eliminate greedy family with multiple reincarnated rinpoches, lamas.

References

Government of Tibet
History of Tibet
1793 in China